The White Horse (Spanish:El caballo blanco) is a 1962 Mexican film. It stars Sara García.

External links
 

1962 films
Mexican musical comedy-drama films
1960s Spanish-language films
1960s Mexican films